Noel Gallo represents District 5 on the Oakland City Council, a position he has held since 2013. Gallo is chair of the public safety committee, where he has advocated for youth curfews and the creation of a Public Safety Oversight Commission.

In 1992 he was the first Hispanic elected to the Oakland School Board on which he also served as President.

Gallo grew up in the Fruitvale district, which he now represents.

References

External links
 Oakland City Council member profile
 Articles about Gallo at East Bay Express, Oakland Local, Oakland North, and Oakland Post
 Gallo at Oakland Wiki
 Noel Gallo Campaign Website

Living people
Oakland City Council members
University of California, Berkeley alumni
Year of birth missing (living people)
Hispanic and Latino American city council members
Politicians from El Paso, Texas
21st-century American politicians